Colin Obasanya Dagba (born 9 September 1998) is a French professional footballer who plays as a right-back for  club Strasbourg, on loan from Paris Saint-Germain.

Club career
On 3 July 2017, Dagba signed his first professional contract with Paris Saint-Germain (PSG), keeping him at the club for three years. He made his professional debut on 4 August 2018, starting in the 2018 Trophée des Champions match against Monaco, which finished as a 4–0 win for PSG.

On 3 October 2019, Dagba signed a contract with PSG lasting until 30 June 2024. His first goal for the Parisian club came in a 3–1 league win against Montpellier on 5 December 2020. In the 2020–21 UEFA Champions League, he started both legs of the quarter-finals between PSG and then-holders Bayern Munich; PSG eventually won the tie on away goals.

On 6 July 2022, Dagba extended his contract with Paris Saint-Germain until 30 June 2025. He subsequently signed for Strasbourg on a season-long loan.

Personal life
Born in France, Dagba's parents are French and Beninese.

Career statistics

Honours
Paris Saint-Germain
Ligue 1: 2018–19, 2019–20, 2021–22
 Coupe de France: 2019–20, 2020–21
 Coupe de la Ligue: 2019–20
Trophée des Champions: 2018, 2019
UEFA Champions League runner-up: 2019–20

References

External links

 
 
 
 
 

1998 births
Living people
People from Béthune
Sportspeople from Pas-de-Calais
French footballers
Association football defenders
US Boulogne players
Paris Saint-Germain F.C. players
RC Strasbourg Alsace players
Ligue 1 players
Championnat National 2 players
Championnat National 3 players
Black French sportspeople
French sportspeople of Beninese descent
Footballers from Hauts-de-France